The Treaty of Ayacucho was an agreement between the Empire of Brazil and Bolivia signed in 1867. It assigned the land of Acre (now a state in Brazil) to Bolivia in exchange for 102,400 square kilometers of territory further north then annexed to Amazonas. It lasted until 1899, when an expedition led by Luis Gálvez Rodríguez de Arias established the Republic of Acre.

Background
Brazil was pressured to sign the agreement due to a threat of Bolivia joining in the war between Paraguay and Brazil. However, despite Bolivian pressure demarcation was not started until the end of the 19th century.

Collapse
In Acre profits in rubber drew thousands of Brazilians, largely immigrants from the poor northern coast of the country (deep semi arid of center-southern Ceará state). In 1889, the situation escalated when the Brazilians living in Acre decided to defy the authority of Bolivia. They wanted to create an independent territory, and request annexation from Brazil. Bolivia's response was to found the city of Puerto Alonso (today Porto Acre). Using military force, in October 1889 the Brazilians occupied and expelled the Bolivians.

In July 1899, with the help of the governor of the state of Amazonas, the Brazilian population proclaimed the Republic of Acre.

Bolivia then leased the region through the Treaty of Aramayo to The Bolivian Syndicate of New York in 1901. However, by August 1902, an insurrection of around two thousand Brazilian guerrillas began. They would finally defeat the Bolivian force in 1903. José Plácido de Castro was proclaimed governor of the Independent Acre.

Supersession
Finally, it was superseded in 1903 by the Treaty of Petrópolis, which gave Acre to Brazil, in exchange for some concessions in Mato Grosso.

References

1867 in Brazil
1867 in Bolivia
Treaties of the Empire of Brazil
Treaties of Bolivia
Ayacucho
Bolivia–Brazil relations
Treaties involving territorial changes